Gurabo Packers is a football team in Puerto Rico, founded in 2016 located in Gurabo, Puerto Rico.  It plays in division 1 of the Puerto Rico American Football League.

History

Club Culture

Gurabo Packers

AFAPR Sub-23
It is the club's U-23 team that participates in the American Football League of Puerto Rico 2nd division of Puerto Rican American football league pyramid, its goal is to develop players with potential so that they can eventually make the jump to either the PRAFL team.

Record

Year-by-year

References

2016 establishments in Puerto Rico
Puerto Rico American Football League teams
Gurabo, Puerto Rico